A number of ships of the Royal Navy have carried the name HMS Strongbow, including:
 , an R-class destroyer, launched in 1916 and sunk in combat in 1917.
 , an S-class submarine, in commission from 1943 to 1945.

Royal Navy ship names